Mitzpe Ilan is a religious community settlement in northern Israel. Located south-west of Umm al-Fahm and close to the Green Line, it falls under the jurisdiction of Menashe Regional Council.

History
The village was established in 2003 as a Nahal settlement, before being settled by 44 families in 2005, at which point it was named Mitzpe Ilan after the Israeli astronaut Ilan Ramon.

References

Community settlements
Menashe Regional Council
Populated places in Haifa District
Populated places established in 2003
2003 establishments in Israel